Route 106 is a  west–east highway in southeastern Massachusetts, United States. Its western terminus is at Route 1A in Plainville and its eastern terminus is at Route 3A in Kingston. Along the way it intersects U.S. Route 1 (US 1) in Plainville.

Route description

Route 106 begins in Plainville at Route 1A. The route heads east, intersecting U.S. Route 1 and Route 152 in quick succession, with Turnpike Lake between the three routes.  As Route 106 passes south of Lake Mirimichi it enters the town of Foxborough.  In Foxborough, Route 106 passes over I-495 and under I-95 within three quarters of a mile without access to either interstate.  The road crosses into Mansfield in Bristol County, where it intersects Route 140 between the two interstates.

Route 106 continues eastward through the town, passing south of the Mansfield MBTA Station (on the Providence/Stoughton Line of the MBTA Commuter Rail).  It then enters Easton, where it becomes concurrent with Route 123 for a mile, crossing Bay Road at the Five Corners, where the two routes split.  It then crosses Route 138 before entering West Bridgewater in Plymouth County.

In West Bridgewater, Route 106 crosses Route 24 at Exits 28 A-B.  Near the center of town it crosses Route 28.  It crosses the Middleborough/Lakeville Line as it enters East Bridgewater.  In East Bridgewater, Route 106 shares a short, quarter-mile concurrency with Route 18 in the village of Elmwood.  It continues eastward, following the Bridgewater town line as intersects the eastern end of Route 104.  The route enters Halifax, passing through swampland as it intersects the northern end of Route 105.  It passes through the center of town before intersecting with Route 58 south of the Monponsett Ponds.  Near the southeast corner of East Monponsett Pond, Route 106 meets the southern end of Route 36.

Route 106 continues eastward, passing through the northern end of Plympton before entering Kingston.  The route continues towards the center of town, meeting the southern end of Route 27 before finally meeting its eastern end at Route 3A near the center of town, just a half mile west of Route 3's Exit 18.

Major intersections

References

External links

106
Plainville, Massachusetts
Foxborough, Massachusetts
Mansfield, Massachusetts
Easton, Massachusetts
West Bridgewater, Massachusetts
East Bridgewater, Massachusetts
Halifax, Massachusetts
Plympton, Massachusetts
Kingston, Massachusetts
Transportation in Bristol County, Massachusetts
Transportation in Norfolk County, Massachusetts
Transportation in Plymouth County, Massachusetts